The Federation of Tax Advisers (FTA) is a professional body concerned with UK taxation issues and is limited by guarantee in the United Kingdom (UK).

Its purpose is to encourage the study of taxation and to promote best practice in the administration of taxation in the UK. The FTA regulates professional tax advisers on a voluntary basis. The FTA campaigns for a fairer and less complex tax system. It also provides a qualification and regulatory structure for its members.

The IFA provides members with tools to operate as tax advisers providing compliance and planning expertise to SMEs and entrepreneurs.

History
The FTA was established in 1997. On 3 June 2009 it became a part of the IFA Group through a merger with the Institute of Financial Accountants and is now its tax faculty.

Qualifications
The FTA offers the following qualifications:

 Associate Member (AFTA)
 Fellow Member (FFTA)

Members at either grade may call themselves IFA Tax Advisers.

Practicing certificate
Members at Associate or Fellow level may apply for and be granted an IFA tax practicing certificate subject to meeting the eligibility criteria. However, this certificate will only allow them to be supervised for taxation work. If they provide services to the public that are not covered by their tax practicing certificate, such as accountancy, this can affect their membership and supervision with the IFA.

An IFA member applying for a tax practising certificate must:
 Be a current member of good standing at either Associate or Fellow level.
 Have worked in the UK for at least two years in an appropriate tax role.
 Be practising in the UK offering taxation services to the public.
 Comply with the IFA's continuing professional development (CPD) requirements.
 Have professional indemnity insurance cover. 
 Be supervised under the Money Laundering Regulations 2007.
 Provide evidence of having achieved a UK taxation qualification equivalent to the IFA taxation qualification.
 Provide evidence of having completed an ethics assessment.

External links
 Official Website
 HMRC CEST Tool
 Institute of Financial Accountants

Taxation in the United Kingdom